Ira S. Nash is an American cardiologist.

Career
Nash is the senior vice president for physician leadership development at Northwell Health, and the associate dean for physician leadership development at the Donald and Barbara Zucker School of Medicine at Hofstra/Northwell.

Previously, Nash served as the Chief Medical Officer and Senior Vice President for Medical Affairs at the Mount Sinai Medical Center and Associate Professor of both Medicine and Health Evidence and Policy at the Mount Sinai School of Medicine.

Nash serves and has served on various editorial boards including Cardiovascular Review and Reports, the American Journal of Medical Quality, the American Journal of Medicine and the Mount Sinai Journal of Medicine. He has published more than 30 articles and 13 books and book chapters and is an associate editor of Hurst's The Heart, a leading textbook. From 1998-2000 he was the host of WCBS-TV's “2 Your Health”.  He is the host of the Well Said podcast.

Nash is a member of the Clinical Council of the American Heart Association (AHA) and serves on the American College of Cardiology (ACC)/AHA Joint Task Force on Clinical Competence, which sets standards for training and expertise in cardiovascular medicine.

Nash was named in Castle Connolly's list of “Best Doctors” in 2007, 2008, 2010 and 2011 and in the New York Times list of “Super Doctors” in 2008, 2009 and 2010.

Nash received his A.B., summa cum laude, in Engineering and Applied Science in 1980 from Harvard University and his M.D., cum laude, in 1984 from Harvard Medical School. His internship (1984–1985) and his residency (1985–1987) in medicine were both at The Beth Israel Hospital in Boston, Massachusetts. From 1987-1989 he was a clinical fellow in Medicine (Cardiology) at Harvard Medical School and  Beth Israel Hospital.

Nash served on the full-time academic staff of the Cardiac Unit of the Massachusetts General Hospital and on the faculty of Harvard Medical School until 1995, when he joined the Mount Sinai Medical Center.

Nash is a Fellow of the American College of Cardiology, the American Heart Association and the American College of Physicians.

Nash currently serves as Commander in the Medical Corps of the United States Navy Reserve.

Honors and awards
Partial list:
2006 Best Grand Rounds, Department of Medicine, Mount Sinai
2007 Castle Connolly "Top Doctor" New York Metro Area
2008, 2009, 2010, 2011 New York Times "Super Doctors"
2008 Castle Connolly "Top Doctor" New York Metro Area
2016 Press Ganey Physician of the Year

Books and chapters
 Nash IS, Fifer MA. Pressure, flow and resistance, in Uretsky BF, ed, Cardiac Catheterization: Concepts, Techniques and Applications, Blackwell. 1997.
 Nash IS, ed. The Cardiologist's Managed Care Manual. TLC Publishing, Boston, MA, 1998.
 Nash IS, Fuster V, eds. Efficacy of Myocardial Infarction Therapy. Marcel Dekker, New York, NY, 1999.
 Nash IS. Medical and health reporting in the news media, in Nash DB, Manfredi MP, Howell S, Bozarth, eds. Connecting with the New Health Care Consumer: Defining Your Strategy, McGraw-Hill, 2000.
 Nash IS. Practice guidelines in cardiovascular care, in Fuster V, et al., eds. Hurst's the Heart, 10th edition, McGraw-Hill, 2001.
 Sagall EL, Nash IS. Cardiac evaluations for legal purposes, in Fuster V, ed. Hurst's the Heart, 10th edition, McGraw-Hill, 2001.
 Nash IS. Practice guidelines in cardiovascular care. Updates to Hurst's the Heart. McGraw-Hill, 2001.
 Fuster V, Alexander W, O'Rourke R, Roberts R, King S, Nash IS, Prystowsky E., eds. Hurst’s The Heart, 11th edition. McGraw-Hill, 2004.
 Nash IS. Practice guidelines in cardiovascular care, in Fuster V, et al., eds. Hurst's the Heart, 11th edition, McGraw-Hill, 2004.
 Fuster V, O'Rourke R, Walsh R, Poole-Wilson P, King S, Roberts R, Nash IS, Prystowsky E., eds. Hurst's The Heart, 12th edition. McGraw-Hill, 2008.
 Nash IS. Practice guidelines in cardiovascular care, in Fuster V, et al., eds. Hurst's the Heart, 12th edition, McGraw-Hill, 2007.
 Maddox TM, Nash IS, Fuster V. Economic costs of atrial fibrillation, in Natale A, ed. Atrial Fibrillation: from Bench to Bedside. Springer-Verlag, 2008.
 Stevens G, Nash IS. Post-discharge care of the cardiothoracic surgical patient, in Filsoufi, ed. Cardiac Surgery. In press.

Publications

References

American cardiologists
Harvard School of Engineering and Applied Sciences alumni
Living people
Icahn School of Medicine at Mount Sinai faculty
Harvard Medical School alumni
Year of birth missing (living people)
Fellows of the American College of Cardiology
Fellows of the American College of Physicians
Fellows of the American Heart Association
Hofstra University faculty